Woolsey is a town in Fayette County, Georgia, United States. The population was 158 at the 2010 census.

Geography

Woolsey is located in southeastern Fayette County at  (33.363354, -84.407942), along Georgia State Route 92.

History 
The Georgia General Assembly incorporated Woolsey as a town in 1893. Woolsey is named after a prominent doctor who served in the Confederacy before being injured.

Demographics

As of the census of 2000, there were 175 people, 57 households, and 49 families residing in the town. The racial makeup of the town was 55.43% White, 43.43% African American and 1.14% Asian. Hispanic or Latino people of any race were 0.57% of the population.

There were 57 households, out of which 42.1% had children under the age of 18 living with them, 78.9% were married couples living together, 3.5% had a female householder with no husband present, and 14.0% were non-families. 10.5% of all households were made up of individuals, and 3.5% had someone living alone who was 65 years of age or older. The average household size was 3.07 and the average family size was 3.29.

In the town, the population was spread out, with 28.0% under the age of 18, 8.0% from 18 to 24, 21.7% from 25 to 44, 29.1% from 45 to 64, and 13.1% who were 65 years of age or older. The median age was 41 years. For every 100 females, there were 98.9 males. For every 100 females age 18 and over, there were 93.8 males.

The median income for a household in the town was $84,103, and the median income for a family was $83,224. Males had a median income of $76,250 versus $62,813 for females. The per capita income for the town was $42,177. About 4.5% of families and 3.0% of the population were below the poverty line, including 4.2% of those under the age of eighteen and none of those 65 or over.

References

Towns in Fayette County, Georgia
Towns in Georgia (U.S. state)